José Alejandro Llanas Alba (born 24 June 1978) is a Mexican politician affiliated with the PAN. He currently serves as Deputy of the LXII Legislature of the Mexican Congress representing Tamaulipas.

References

1978 births
Living people
Politicians from Tamaulipas
National Action Party (Mexico) politicians
21st-century Mexican politicians
People from Río Bravo, Tamaulipas
Deputies of the LXII Legislature of Mexico
Members of the Chamber of Deputies (Mexico) for Tamaulipas